Francisco de Paula Agundis Arias (born 9 November 1969) is a Mexican politician affiliated with the PVEM. He served as Senator of the LX and LXI Legislatures of the Mexican Congress representing the Federal District. He also served as Deputy during the LVIII Legislature.

References

1969 births
Living people
Politicians from Mexico City
Members of the Senate of the Republic (Mexico)
Members of the Chamber of Deputies (Mexico)
Ecologist Green Party of Mexico politicians
21st-century Mexican politicians
Universidad Iberoamericana alumni
Members of the Congress of Mexico City